The Braves–Mets rivalry is a rivalry between the Atlanta Braves and New York Mets. Both clubs are members of Major League Baseball's National League (NL) East division. The rivalry between the two clubs was particularly fierce during the late 1990s and early 2000s.

Background
Due to Major League Baseball wishing to keep the Cardinals and Cubs together in the same division when each league was split into divisions in 1969, Atlanta was forced to join the National League West and were led by Hank Aaron. In 1966, pitching prospect Tom Seaver signed a contract with the Braves when they drafted him in the first round of the secondary June draft (20th overall). But the contract was voided by Baseball Commissioner William Eckert because Seaver's college team had played two exhibition games already that year, despite the fact that Seaver himself did not play in the games. Seaver intended, then, to finish the college season, but because he had signed a pro contract, the NCAA ruled him ineligible. After Seaver's father complained to Eckert about the unfairness of the situation and threatened with a lawsuit, Eckert ruled that other teams could match the Braves' offer. The Mets were subsequently awarded his signing rights in a lottery drawing among the three teams (the Philadelphia Phillies and Cleveland Indians being the two others) that were willing to match the Braves' terms. Seaver went on to have a Hall of Fame career with the Mets, having his jersey retired by the organization.

1969 NLCS

Seaver's impact was heavy as he led a staff that boasted excellent pitching, including then prospect Nolan Ryan in 1969. Perennial losers, the Mets came back to win the division and face off against the Braves in the NLCS. The "Miracle Mets" swept the Braves in the series, en route to their first World Series championship against the Baltimore Orioles in the 1969 World Series. The series against the Braves was the first playoff appearance and series win by an expansion team and their World Series win by extension was the first won by an expansion team.

Despite the early confrontation, the rivalry did not become especially heated until the 1990s, when division realignment put the Mets and Braves in the same division. During this time period, the Braves became one of the most dominant teams in professional baseball. The rivalry came to a visible head with the John Rocker controversy, where Atlanta pitcher Rocker made a number of derogatory comments about residents of New York City in 1999. This led to incidents of items such as full cups of beverages, and even batteries being thrown at Braves players, namely Rocker, when visiting the Mets. With the end of the Braves' fourteen-season National League East winning streak in 2006, when the Mets won their first division title since 1988, the rivalry hit a cooling period.

Division realignment: rivalry established
The main cause of the rivalry was division realignment. However, the Mets and the Cubs voted against the plan.

When agreeing on the realignment, the Pittsburgh Pirates switched to the newly created Central Division and gave up their spot in the NL East to the Braves.

The Braves had already established themselves as one of the dominant teams in baseball prior to realignment with appearances in two World Series prior to the move. The Mets had a reverse of fortune from their dominance in the late 1980s to one of the worst teams in baseball during the early 1990s.

1995: Atlanta's first championship

In 1995, the Braves won the National League East by 21 games, and were the only team in the division to post a winning record. However, the Mets were the only team in the league to post a winning record against the eventual champions, posting an 8–5 record with a 5–1 mark at Shea Stadium, propelled by a sweep on the final weekend of the season, helping the Mets finish the season tied for second with the Philadelphia Phillies. (Mets won the tie-breaker, having won the season series against the Phillies.)

Just a year after realignment the Braves won their first championship in Atlanta by defeating the Cleveland Indians in the 1995 World Series. It was the franchise's first World Series victory in Atlanta and allowed the franchise to become the first ever to win a World Series in three different cities, having previously done so in Boston and Milwaukee. The Braves' dominance over the National League would continue as they would go on to win the pennant again in 1996 behind the pitching of Greg Maddux, Tom Glavine, and John Smoltz.

1996–2000: The rivalry intensifies
With the exception of 1996, when the Mets were near the bottom of the National League East, both franchises fielded contenders until deep into each season during this period. In 1997, the Mets overcame a shaky start to the season and were a wild card contender until the final week of the season. Ultimately, though, they finished third place in the NL East and thirteen games back of Atlanta. From 1998 to 2000, the Mets finished second in the standings to the Braves, eighteen, six and a half, and one game behind in those respective seasons. With the St. Louis Cardinals sweeping the Braves in the 2000 NLDS, it made the Mets run to their first World Series appearance since their championship season of  much easier. The Braves had eliminated the Mets from wild-card contention on the final day of the 1998 season and in six games in the 1999 NLCS.

1999 NLCS

The NLCS was along the backdrop of Atlanta power hitter Chipper Jones cementing his MVP award that year by crushing Mets pitching for 4 home runs in three games, and 5 walks in the last days of the regular season the Braves swept the series and moved 4 games ahead of the Mets with 9 games to play to their eventual division crown. Thinking that the Braves had eliminated the Mets from playoff contention as they had the year before, Chipper Jones infamously remarked: "now all the Mets fans can go home and put their Yankee stuff on." Despite the setback, the Mets made the playoffs for the first time since 1988. Both had moved forward in the NLDS to see each other for the first time in post-season history since division realignment and since their initial post-season meeting during the 1969 NLCS and the "Miracle Mets."

The Braves took an early series lead of 3 games to 0, and looked poised to sweep the Mets out of the playoffs. However, the Mets rallied late in Game 4 off Braves' closer and perpetual Mets' nemesis John Rocker to win Game 4. The drama of the series was intensified in Game 5 when Robin Ventura hit a walk-off Grand Slam Single to win the game. The Braves, however, would go on to win the series from the Mets in six games to win their 5th National League pennant of the decade. At the end of the 1999 NLCS, Bob Costas closed out his NBC telecast by saying, "It was closing night for the greatest Mets show since (their championship season of) 1986." Despite their hard-fought win against the Mets, the Braves would go on to get swept by the Mets' cross-town rivals, the New York Yankees, who had beaten their biggest nemesis, Boston Red Sox, in the ALCS, in the 1999 World Series. With the exception of Game 1, all the games were decided by 1 run. Game 1 was decided by 2 runs.

2000

John Rocker controversy
For a story published in the January 2000 issue of Sports Illustrated, Braves' closer John Rocker made a number of allegations stemming from his experiences in New York City and answering a question about whether he would ever play for the New York Yankees or the New York Mets.  Rocker's response was racist, homophobic, and sexist:

  
During the interview, he also spoke of his opinion of the New York Mets and their fans:

The interview was conducted while driving to a speaking engagement in Atlanta.

Mets win NL pennant

In June 2000, the Mets achieved a 10-run comeback, In , both the Mets and the Braves defeated each other at Shea Stadium to clinch playoff spots in successive days. First, the Braves won the NL East, defeating the Mets. The next day, the Mets beat the Braves to win the wild card, eliminating the Los Angeles Dodgers. While both the Mets and the Braves were favorites to face each other in the National League Championship Series for a second straight year, the Braves ended up losing to the Cardinals in the 2000 NLDS. On October 7 during game 3 of NLDS at Shea Stadium, Met fans cheered as the scoreboard showed the Braves loss and elimination at the hands of the Cardinals. This assured Met fans their biggest and toughest rival would not impede their playoff run that year. The Mets easily defeated the Giants to move on to the 2000 National League Championship Series, where they defeated the Cardinals to move on to the World Series. In defeating the Cardinals, the Mets clinched their first pennant since winning the 1986 World Series. The Mets would go on to lose the 2000 World Series to the Yankees in the first post-season Subway Series since the 1956 World Series.

2001 to 2021: the rivalry cools
Twice during the  season, the rivalry saw peace. The Mets opened the 2001 season playing the Braves at Turner Field. When the Mets walked into their clubhouse prior to their workout before opening day, officials at the stadium greeted them by writing on the clubhouse message board: "Welcome to the National League champion New York Mets." A week later, the Mets hosted the Braves at Shea Stadium when they raised their 2000 National League Champions banner. During pre-game festivities on September 21, 2001 at Shea Stadium, both the Braves and Mets paused to remember the victims of the terrorist attacks in New York and Washington ten days before. This was the first professional sporting event held in New York since the attacks. With the Mets down 2-1 in the bottom of the eighth inning, Piazza hit a two-run home run to help the Mets win. The significance of his spirit-lifting home run has been cited as one of the greatest moments in Major League Baseball history.

In 2003, the Mets signed legendary Braves pitcher Tom Glavine for four years, $42.5 million. Glavine had poor success in his first year with the team, but did help the Mets reach the 2006 NLCS against the St. Louis Cardinals where they fell in the 7th game. Towards the end of his tenure with the Mets, Glavine started to make grumblings about signing with them and not staying in Atlanta. In his final appearance as a Met on the last day of the 2007 New York Mets season, with a postseason appearance on the line, Glavine would give up 7 runs in the first inning of a loss to the Florida Marlins. The loss caused the Mets to lose the division to the Philadelphia Phillies. Losing the division meant the Mets missed the playoffs despite being in first place by 7 games as late as September. Some Mets fans believe Glavine threw the game to hurt the Mets, and that his true loyalty lied with the Braves. Glavine would leave the Mets following that season and go back to the Braves. The Braves collapsed in a similar way in 2011, for the National League Wild Card, blowing a  lead for the National League Wild Card in September and losing the wild card by one game to the eventual champion St. Louis Cardinals. The Mets took two out of three in a late September series at Turner Field to contribute to the collapse.

In 2004, Chipper Jones named his child "Shea" after the Mets' home Shea Stadium, citing his great success and memories of playing there.

For opening day on April 3, 2017, the Mets and Braves played against one-another at Citi Field. Prior to that, the Braves had won six straight games at Citi Field. On April 5, 2017, Mets veteran RHP Bartolo Colón made his Braves appearance at Citi Field, stating he was "very happy and excited to go back there and get the opportunity to play against my ex-teammates."

2022: 101 wins
In 2022, both the Braves and the Mets won 101 games and made the 2022 postseason. However, the National League East title and first-round bye was decided in a crucial three-game series at Truist Park from September 30 to October 2. Entering the series, both teams were 98–59, and while the Mets have led the NL East for a majority of the season, the Braves closed the gap in the division race, in large part due to a 14-game winning streak in June and a 74–32 stretch during the final three months. Atlanta swept the three-game series in which the Mets' top starters Jacob deGrom, Max Scherzer, and Chris Bassitt combined to allow 11 earned runs. The sweep allowed the Braves to win the season series 10–9, claiming the NL East division title and first-round bye while New York finished as the top wild card team. Neither team advanced beyond their first series they played in, with the Braves losing to the Philadelphia Phillies in the 2022 NLDS, and the Mets losing to the San Diego Padres in the Wild Card series.

See also
Major League Baseball rivalries

References

New York Mets
Atlanta Braves
Major League Baseball rivalries